Ashburton District Council is the territorial authority for the Ashburton District of New Zealand. The council consists of the mayor of Ashburton and nine ward councillors.

Composition

The councillors are elected from three wards: five from the Ashburton ward, and two each from the Eastern and Western wards. The mayor is elected at-large.

Councillors

 Mayor 
 Western Ward: Deputy Mayor Liz McMillan, Rodger Letham
 Eastern Ward: Lynette Lovett, Stuart Wilson
 Ashburton Ward: Leen Braam, Carolyn Cameron, John Falloon, Angus McKay, Diane Rawlinson

Community boards

 Methven Community Board: Dan McLaughlin, Sonia McAlpine, Kelvin Holmes, Rodger Letham, Liz McMillan, Ron Smith

History

The council was formed in 1989, replacing the Ashburton County Council established in 1878.

In 2020, the council had 307 staff, including 43 earning more than $100,000. According to the right-wing Taxpayers' Union think tank, residential rates averaged $2,336.

References

External links

 Official website

Ashburton District
Politics of Canterbury, New Zealand
Territorial authorities of New Zealand